San Francesco da Paola ai Monti is  18th-century titular church in Rome. It is dedicated to St Francis of Paola, and is located in the Monti rione.

History
It was built in 1645–50 with funds given by Olimpia Aldobrandini Pamphili, who (like St Francis) had roots in Calabria. It was designed by Giovanni Pietro Morandi, given to the Minim Friars, and became the national church of the Calabrians. The monastery was refurbished under Father Francesco Zavaroni di Montalto, General of the order, and using as an architect Luigi Berettoni. 

The late Baroque high altar was made by Giovanni Antonio de Rossi c. 1655 (who is also credited with the church's wooden tabernacle, set into a sculptured entrance of a military pavilion).  No new bell tower was built for the church - instead the 12th century Torre dei Margani was used, preserving its medieval coat-of-arms on the tower has been preserved. 

However, the church as a whole was not consecrated until 10 July 1728, by Pope Benedict XIII.  The lower part of the façade was refinished in plaster in the 18th century, and the whole church was then restored in 1826 by Pope Leo XII.

The present titular cardinal-deacon of the church, since 21 October 2003, is Renato Martino.

Chapels
The church contains an icon of Francis said to be a copy of a portrait, along with scenes from the life and miracles of the saint which can be seen in the sacristy and examples by Giuseppe Chiari in the second chapel on the south side.  

The ceiling of the sacristy was painted by Sassoferrato, with a motif of "The Blessed Virgin appearing to St Francis of Paola". On the side wall is a Crucifixion and St Francis of Paola by Francesco Cozza.

By the door to the presbytery are the tombs of Lazzaro Pallavicini and Giovanni Pizzullo, both with busts by Agostino Corsini.  

South side chapels (right as you enter)
1st: Altarpiece of Saint Anne, Joachim and the Madonna by Filippo Luzi and ceiling frescoes by Onofrio Avellino.  
2nd: Altarpiece of St Francis of Assisi
3rd: Altarpiece of Sts Francis of Paola and Francis of Sales, patrons of the Order, painted by Antonio Crecolini.
North side chapels
1st chapel: Altarpiece by Stefano Pozzo and ceilings frescoed by Onofrio Avellino
2nd chapel: Altarpiece of Immaculate Conception by Stefano Pozzo
3rd chapel: painting of St Michael the Archangel by Giacomo Triga and relics of Blessed Nicola of Langobardi in a porphyry urn.

Cardinal-deacons
Alexandre Renard (1967–1976)
Joseph-Marie Trịnh Như Khuê (1976–1978)
Pietro Pavan (1985–1994)
Renato Martino (2003–present)

Notes

Francesco
1728 establishments in the Papal States
Religious organizations established in the 1720s
National churches in Rome
1728 establishments in Italy
18th-century Roman Catholic church buildings in Italy